"Saints" is a song by the Breeders, released as the third and final single from their 1993 album Last Splash. It was released in 1994 on 4AD/Elektra Records.

Track listing 

"Saints" is a different version than the one on Last Splash, and is the version used for the song's music video.

Music video 
The music video was directed by Frank Sacramento and features the band playing the song in a snowy forest, as well as the band walking around a carnival while certain parts are played at the fair. The video uses the version of the song issued as a single.

Charts

References

The Breeders songs
1994 singles
Songs written by Kim Deal
4AD singles
1993 songs